In intuitionistic type theory (ITT), some discipline within mathematical logic, induction-induction is for simultaneously declaring some inductive type and some inductive predicate over this type.

An inductive definition is given by rules for generating elements of some type. One can then define some predicate on that type by providing constructors for forming the elements of the predicate , such inductively on the way the elements of the type are generated. Induction-induction generalizes this situation since one can simultaneously define the type and the predicate, because the rules for generating elements of the type  are allowed to refer to the predicate .

Induction-induction can be used to define larger types including various universe constructions in type theory. and limit constructions in category/topos theory.

Example 1 

Present the type  as having the following constructors , note the early reference to the predicate  :

 
 

and-simultaneously present the predicate  as having the following constructors :

 
 
 if  and  then 

Example 2 

A simple common example is the Universe à la  Tarski type former. It creates some inductive type  and some inductive predicate .

See also 
 Induction-recursion – for simultaneously declaring some inductive type and some recursive function on this type .

References

External links 
A list of Peter Dybjer's publications on induction and induction-recursion

Type theory